Salute Your Shorts is an American children's comedy television series that aired on Nickelodeon. The series premiered on July 4, 1991 and ran for two seasons, with the final first-run episode airing on September 12, 1992.

Series overview

Episodes

Pilot (1990)

Season 1 (1991)

Season 2 (1992)

References

External links
 

Lists of American teen comedy television series episodes
Lists of Nickelodeon television series episodes